Borowa Wola  is a village in the administrative district of Gmina Klwów, within Przysucha County, Masovian Voivodeship, in east-central Poland.

The village has an approximate population of 150.

References

Borowa Wola